The 2003–04 season was the 35th campaign of the Scottish Men's National League, the national basketball league of Scotland. The season featured 10 teams; from the previous season, St Mirren Buddies joined the league and Arbroath Musketeers did not return. City of Edinburgh Kings won their second league title with an unbeaten season.

Teams

The line-up for the 2003-04 season featured the following teams:

Boroughmuir
City of Edinburgh Kings
Clark Erikkson Fury
Dunfermline Reign
East Lothian Peregrines
Glasgow d2
Glasgow Storm
St Mirren Reid Kerr College
St Mirren Buddies
Troon Tornadoes

League table

 Source: Scottish National League 2003-04 - Britball

References

Scottish Basketball Championship Men seasons
basketball
basketball